Thomas Belasyse, 1st Earl Fauconberg (27 April 1699 – 8 February 1774) was a British peer.

Fauconberg was the son and heir of Thomas Belasyse, 3rd Viscount Fauconberg, by his wife Bridget Gage, a daughter of Sir John Gage, 4th Baronet. He was raised as a Roman Catholic, but made a public abjuration of the faith and converted to the Church of England. Fauconberg succeeded to his father's viscountcy on 26 November 1718. He served as a Lord of the Bedchamber to George II between 1738 and 1760, and was made a member of the Privy Council. On 16 June 1756, he was created Earl Fauconberg in the Peerage of Great Britain.

He married Catherine Betham, the daughter of John Betham, on 5 August 1726. He was succeeded in his titles by his son, Henry.

References

}

1699 births
1774 deaths
Earls in the Peerage of Great Britain
Members of the Privy Council of Great Britain
Converts to Anglicanism from Roman Catholicism
Viscounts Fauconberg